Akandhan Velusami Radhakrishnan (born 1 August 1952) is a Sri Lankan politician and state minister. He is the leader of the Up-Country People's Front (UCPF), a member of the Tamil Progressive Alliance (TPA) and United National Front for Good Governance (UNFGG).

Early life and family
Radhakrishnan was born on 1 August 10.1952 He was educated at Holy Trinity College, Nuwara Eliya, St. Peter's College, Colombo and St. Joseph's College, Colombo. He is married and has four children.

Career
Radhakrishnan was elected to Nuwara Eliya Divisional Council and became its chairman in 1991. He contested the 1999 provincial council election as one of the Indian Origin People's Front's candidates in Nuwara Eliya District and was elected to the Central Provincial Council (CPC). He was Minister of Culture and Tamil Education. He contested the 2004 provincial council election as one of the United National Front's (UNF) candidates in Nuwara Eliya District and was re-elected to the CPC. In February 2005 he was appointed Minister of Tamil Education (other than Muslim Schools) Industries, Estate Infrastructure Facilities, Hindu Cultural Affairs, Youth Affairs and Sports. He was re-elected at the 2009 provincial council election, this times as a United People's Freedom Alliance (UPFA) candidate. In March 2009 he was appointed Minister of Industries, Sports, Women Affairs, Rural Development, Estate Infrastructure Facilities Development, Hindu Cultural Affairs, Education (Tamil) and Youth Affairs.

Radhakrishnan contested the 2010 parliamentary election as one of the UPFA's candidates in Nuwara Eliya District and was elected to Parliament. On 11 September 2010 Radhakrishnan left the Ceylon Workers' Congress to sit as an independent MP supporting UPFA. He joined the Up-Country People's Front as its political leader on 7 October 2010. He was appointed Deputy Minister of Botanical Gardens and Public Recreation on 9 October 2014.

Radhakrishnan resigned from the UPFA government on 10 December 2014 to support common opposition candidate Maithripala Sirisena at the presidential election. After the election newly elected President Sirisena rewarded Radhakrishnan by appointing him State Minister of Education.

Radhakrishnan was one of the United National Front for Good Governance's candidates in Nuwara Eliya District at the 2015 parliamentary election. He was elected and re-entered Parliament. After the election he was re-appointed State Minister of Education.

Radhakrishnan was elected leader of the UCPF on 6 September 2015.

Electoral history

References

External links 

1952 births
Alumni of Saint Joseph's College, Colombo
Alumni of St. Peter's College, Colombo
Ceylon Workers' Congress politicians
Culture ministers of Sri Lankan provinces
Deputy ministers of Sri Lanka
Education ministers of Sri Lankan provinces
Living people
Local authority councillors of Sri Lanka
Indian Tamil politicians of Sri Lanka
Members of the 14th Parliament of Sri Lanka
Members of the 15th Parliament of Sri Lanka
Members of the 16th Parliament of Sri Lanka
Members of the Central Provincial Council
People from Central Province, Sri Lanka
Sports ministers of Sri Lankan provinces
Sri Lankan Hindus
State ministers of Sri Lanka
Up-Country People's Front politicians
United People's Freedom Alliance politicians
Samagi Jana Balawegaya politicians